The Hôtel Silvy (a.k.a. the Hôtel Ripert de Monclar or the Hôtel Bourguignon de Fabregoules) is a listed hôtel particulier in Aix-en-Provence.

Location
It is located at number 35 on the rue Roux Alpheran in the Quartier Mazarin of Aix-en-Provence.

History
The hotel was built in the seventeenth century for the Silvy family, a family of landowners and magistrates from Aix. In the garden, the fountain was built in the eighteenth century.

It was the private residence of Jean-Pierre-François de Ripert-Monclar (1711-1773) and his wife, Catherine de Lisle. It was later the residence of Jean-Baptiste de Bourguignon de Fabregoules (1746-1838), an art collector who bequeathed his art collection to the Musée Granet in Aix.

Heritage significance
The fountain and the garden have been listed as monuments historiques since 1929. The hotel has been listed as a monument historique since 1984.

References

Hôtels particuliers in Aix-en-Provence
Monuments historiques of Aix-en-Provence